Antevs Glacier, also known as North Heim Glacier, is a glacier on Arrowsmith Peninsula, Graham Land, flowing north between Seue Peaks and Boyle Mountains into Muller Ice Shelf, Lallemand Fjord. It was named by the United Kingdom Antarctic Place-Names Committee in 1960 after Ernst V. Antevs, American glacial geologist.

See also
 Heim Glacier
 List of glaciers in the Antarctic
 Glaciology

References
 

Glaciers of Loubet Coast